XHAHU-FM (103.3 FM, "Vive FM") is a radio station in Ciudad Anáhuac, Nuevo León. XHAHU is part of the Nuevo León state-owned Radio Nuevo León public network.

References

Radio stations in Nuevo León
Public radio in Mexico